Peter Riley is a writer.

Peter Riley may also refer to:

Pete Riley, musician
Peter Riley, character in Hearts in Atlantis

See also
Peter Reilly (disambiguation)